Dosan Park is a park in the neighborhood of Sinsa-dong, Gangnam, Seoul, South Korea. It was established in 1973 to commemorate the achievement and legacy of independence activist An Chang-ho, whose pen name was Dosan. In Dosan Park, there is the Dosan Ahn Chang-ho Memorial Hall to commemorate him.

Gallery

Transportation 
Apgujeong Station, Apgujeongrodeo Station

See also
List of parks in Seoul
Kim Koo Museum

References

Gangnam District
Parks in Seoul